John Cockburn-Hood (16 January 1844 – 30 August 1902) was an English cricketer. He played nineteen first-class matches for Cambridge University Cricket Club between 1864 and 1869.

See also
 List of Cambridge University Cricket Club players

References

External links
 

1844 births
1902 deaths
English cricketers
Cambridge University cricketers
Cricketers from Sydney
Gentlemen of England cricketers
English cricketers of 1864 to 1889